Out the Gate is a collaborative album by rapper Termanology and producer DC the Midi Alien.

Track listing

External links 
 "", "UGHH", 2006.

2006 albums
Termanology albums